Heritage Square was a Storybook Victorian theme park shopping village at Golden, Colorado. It was originally built as Magic Mountain in 1957–59 by a group spearheaded by prominent Wheat Ridge businessman Walter Francis Cobb and Denver sculptor John Calvin Sutton. They hired Marco Engineering, Inc., led by original Disneyland vice president C. V. Wood Jr., to build the theme park, the earliest known to have attempted to spread the theme park industry beyond Disneyland. Several veteran Hollywood art directors who worked on Disneyland created the design of Magic Mountain, led by MGM veteran Wade B. Rubottom and Disney veteran Dick Kelsey. The park is one of the world's foremost and best-preserved examples of Storybook design, a form of architecture translating to real life the stage and cinematic arts. Although Magic Mountain collapsed in 1960, it was eventually reopened by Woodmoor Corporation as Heritage Square in 1971. It featured a collection of artisan shops, children's rides, the second alpine slide outside a ski resort in North America, the Heritage Square Music Hall, Rio Golden train, and more. Admission was free, and it was open year-round. While much of Heritage Square closed after the 2015 season, the Victorian Event Center and The Amusement Park, including the Garden Grill and picnic areas, remained open temporarily. The park officially closed on June 30, 2018.

Beginnings as Magic Mountain
Walter Francis Cobb, noting the great possibilities of family entertainment that the theme park concept had to offer, teamed up in 1952 with John Calvin Sutton to create such a place for Denver-area residents to enjoy. The great success of Disneyland further fueled their ambitions, and in May 1957 they incorporated Magic Mountain, Inc., a stock offering company, for investment to build the new theme park.

South Table Mountain site
At first the new theme park targeted as a building site the northeastern alcove of South Table Mountain, just east of Golden, Colorado, and purchased  of land to do so. The park's original concept at this location included a rainbow gateway guarded by giant genies, an enchanted forest, a Queen's Castle towering atop the mountain with an Old World court and fountains, themed refreshment stands including a pumpkin, polar bear and locomotive, serving snacks via miniature train, a seafood ship, and a monorail. However, this site met with sharp and unexpected opposition from the nearby residents of the new subdivision of Applewood, who objected to the impact of the development, including traffic and building on the scenic mountain. Cobb soon complied with the community's wishes and walked away to an alternative location.  Eventually this original location would become partly Rolling Hills Country Club and (upon the mountain) preserved scenic open space.

Apex site
During the Colorado Gold Rush, this had been part of the site of Apex, an early base camp community at an important crossroads of thoroughfares leading to the gold fields, including the Apex Road, which led up the gulch. At the same time, Cobb learned of the new theme park creating firm of Marco Engineering, Inc., formed by Cornelius Vanderbilt Wood, and hired them to design Magic Mountain at this location. Among the members of Wood's firm were several veteran Hollywood art directors, including some who had worked on Disneyland itself. The lead designers for Magic Mountain were Wade B. Rubottom and Richmond (Dick) Kelsey.

Themed areas and attractions
In the design dreamed up for Magic Mountain, the park was based on Colorado history, development and future. It was to be surrounded by an authentic narrow gauge train of the type historic to Golden and the Colorado mountains, and the park included 6 themed areas:

 Cavalry Post and Stockade (frontier protection for settlers)
 Centennial City (Old West downtown)
 Fairgrounds (amusement facilities including a Mine Ride and Creation of the Earth Ride)
 Forest River (mountaineers, American Indians and fur traders)
 Magic of Industry (story of industrial progress in the American west including Outer Space Lines ride)
 Storybook Lane (fairy tale land for younger visitors)

Magic Mountain also was to include a ski slope upon Jackson Hill to its west.

Construction and demise
In 1957–59, the core of Magic Mountain was built, including the Magic Mountain Railroad, Cavalry Post and Stockade, and Centennial City. The historic Eden Palais, one of the largest carousel rides in the world, was shipped in and put to use here. However, financial difficulties began to arise and further plans were changed or scaled back. One building of the Fairgrounds was built, the Forest River Ride area created in altered form, and Storybook Lane and Magic of Industry scrapped altogether. Arguably the most ambitious part did materialize, the Magic Mountain ski area, scaled down to a rope tow instead of a ski lift, but nevertheless one of the first ski areas in North America to be operated with artificial snow. The ski area was successful; unfortunately the theme park was not. After opening to the public in 1959, it encountered continued financial difficulties and ultimately closed in 1960. Famed New York City developer William Zeckendorf, and Cobb himself (who was not blamed for its financial downfall), attempted to save the park, but its fate was inexorable and its components auctioned off. Its rides went to newly forming Six Flags Over Texas, while the core complex stood idle for some time.

Rebirth as Heritage Square

In 1970, the Woodmoor Corporation acquired Magic Mountain and set about to resurrect the park as Heritage Square, a theme shopping village of artisan shops and attractions. Opening in 1971, it featured several popular places, including the Metal Master, General Store, Glassblower, Gasthaus beer garden restaurant, and Cedar Chest. A group of comedy melodramatic players formed in Estes Park led by G. William Oakley took possession of the Magic Mountain Play House in 1972, as the Heritage Square Players, and opened the Heritage Square Opera House. In 1973, they retrofitted the building across the main thoroughfare for an auditorium theater, while the Christmas Tree shop opened nearby, one of the first year-round Christmas shops in the country. Also that year, upon Jackson Hill, the second alpine slide outside a ski resort in North America was built, which became another noted attraction. A historic Lakewood schoolhouse was moved to the head of the main street and became Heritage Square's wedding chapel.
 In 1988, the Opera House was reborn under direction of actor T.J. Mullin as the Heritage Square Music Hall, which was one of the most popular dinner theater establishments in Colorado until its closure in 2013.

Storybook architecture
Heritage Square is noted for being among the world's best preserved examples of a unique and artistic form of design born of the screen and stage arts.  Storybook design, as it has become known, translates screen buildings to real life using architectural embellishments, whimsical distortions and forced perspective to make the buildings appear taller or larger than they really are (the buildings and blocks are 2/3 scale of their historic downtown Golden counterparts).  Kelsey and Rubottom thoroughly studied and drew upon historic Colorado styles to translate into this medium, including several historically used in Golden and the Denver area, such as Second Empire, Gothic Revival, Pueblo Revival, Dutch Colonial Revival, frontier log building design and more.  It gave the feeling of an old west town which was friendly to children and other patrons through its creative and artistic design, unusually ornate and hand carved on site.

Current ownership
 
Over the years, Heritage Square's ownership has changed hands many times. Currently, Heritage Square is owned by Martin Marietta Corporation, which also owns the quarry next to the complex.
Previous ownership was Lafarge, which bought Heritage Square early in the 1990s and currently runs the complex in the red as a tax writeoff and a buffer to the City of Golden. By using Heritage Square as a buffer to the city, Lafarge is able to prevent development near their active quarry and give room from the sound of the blasts used to break apart the rock. On quiet days, one can hear and even feel the blasts from the park.

Following the 2015 season, the Alpine Slide and the Town closed. Miner's Maze and the Church were relocated. The Amusement Park at Heritage Square, including the Garden Grill, the Corporate Picnic Areas and the Victorian Event Center, remained open until 2018.

Amusement park
The Amusement Park at Heritage Square featured the following kiddie rides; Swings, Balloon Ride, Banana Squadron, Carousel, Crazy Bus, Himalaya, Miner Mike Roller Coaster, Python Pit Roller Coaster, Tea Cups, Tilt-a-Whirl, Scrambler and Ferris Wheel. In addition to these attractions are both non-squirting bumper and swan shaped paddle boats. In the summer of 2012, the Amusement Park at Heritage Square also added a space shuttle and a zipline in 2013. The summer of 2013 also saw the removal of kiddie go-karts. The park also features junior, adult and slick track Go-Carts. Special features include pony rides on weekends and holidays. The Amusement Park at Heritage Square is independent of the Rio Golden Railroad, Miners Maze Adventureland and the Alpine Slide.

Railroads

Heritage Square's railroad, known successively as the Magic Mountain Railroad, High Country Railroad, and Rio Golden Railroad, has been operated by these steam powered locomotives through its existence:

 D&RG/RGS locomotive #42 (Baldwin, narrow gauge, 1887) - operated 1959-61
 Lima Shay locomotive #3118 (Lima, narrow gauge, 1920) - 24 inch gauge, operated 1975-89
 Denver & Rio Golden locomotive #463 (Ulrich, miniature gauge, 1998) - operated 1998-2006
 Rio Golden locomotive #1 (gas hydraulic drive, weighs 3,000 lbs) - operated 2006–present

Honors
In 1975, the Jefferson County Historical Commission awarded Heritage Square designation as a Centennial Site.  It was one of 25 places so honored as part of Jefferson County's part in Colorado's Centennial-Bicentennial celebration (recognized Colorado's centennial and the United States' bicentennial), in recognition of the site's history as the Apex town and Heritage Square's part in history.

In media
At least one season of the popular Food Network show Unwrapped was filmed at the Notz Landing Diner.

References

External links

Heritage Square turns 50
History of Magic Mountain/Heritage Square

Buildings and structures in Golden, Colorado
Defunct ski areas and resorts in Colorado
Defunct amusement parks in the United States
Tourist attractions in Golden, Colorado
1959 establishments in Colorado